The 1892 United States presidential election in Massachusetts took place on November 8, 1892, as part of the 1892 United States presidential election. Voters chose 15 representatives, or electors to the Electoral College, who voted for president and vice president.

Massachusetts voted for the Republican nominee, incumbent President Benjamin Harrison, over the Democratic nominee, former President Grover Cleveland, who was running for a second, non-consecutive term. Harrison won the state by a narrow margin of 6.65%.

With 51.87% of the popular vote, Massachusetts would prove to be Harrison's third strongest victory in terms of percentage in the popular vote after neighboring Vermont and Maine.

As of 2020, this remains the last presidential election in which Massachusetts has voted Republican while neighboring New York has voted Democratic.

Results

See also
 United States presidential elections in Massachusetts

References

Massachusetts
1892
1892 Massachusetts elections